The United States competed at the 1968 Summer Paralympics in Tel Aviv, Israel from November 4 to 13, 1968. The team finished first out of the twenty-eight competing nations in the medal table and won ninety-nine medals: thirty-three gold, twenty-seven silver and thirty-nine bronze. Eighty-two American athletes took part; fifty-three men and twenty-nine women.

Ed Owen won medals in six different sports; nine golds and a bronze in athletics, two golds in swimming and a silver in wheelchair basketball.

Disability classifications

The Paralympics groups athletes' disabilities into one of five disability categories; amputation, the condition may be congenital or sustained through injury or illness; cerebral palsy; wheelchair athletes, there is often overlap between this and other categories; visual impairment, including blindness; Les autres, any physical disability that does not fall strictly under one of the other categories, for example dwarfism or multiple sclerosis. Each Paralympic sport then has its own classifications, dependent upon the specific physical demands of competition. Events are given a code, made of numbers and letters, describing the type of event and classification of the athletes competing.

Medalists

The following United States athletes won medals at the Games;

Dartchery

The only dartchery event at the Games was the mixed pairs event which took a knockout format. The United States was represented by Geissinger and Kelderhouse; the pair beat athletes from Jamaica, Italy and Australia to set up a semi-final meeting with Tanaka and Matsumoto of Japan. The Americans won the match and went on to defeat a second Australian pair in the final round to win the gold medal.

Wheelchair basketball

America entered teams in both the men's and women's wheelchair basketball events and won medals in each. The women's event took the form of a single pool stage with medals awarded to the top three teams. The USA team won two matches and lost two matches, scoring 31 points and conceding 30, to finish in third place and take the bronze medal. The men's event featured a pool stage followed by a knockout competition. The USA men beat Great Britain and the Switzerland and Germany to advance to the quarterfinals. They then beat Argentina and Great Britain again to reach the gold medal match. Facing the hosts Israel, USA lost 47–37 and had to settle for the silver medals.

See also
United States at the 1968 Summer Olympics

Notes

References

Nations at the 1968 Summer Paralympics
1968
Paralympics